At least two ships of the Argentine Navy have been named ARA Rivadavia:

 The first Rivadavia was launched in 1902 but sold to Japan while still incomplete at the end of the Argentine–Chilean naval arms race, where it was renamed . It was sunk in 1945.
 , the lead ship of its class, was launched in 1911 and scrapped in 1957.
 , a cancelled 

In addition at least two ships of the Argentine Navy has been named ARA Comodoro Rivadavia:

 , a survey vessel commissioned in 1928 as San Juan she was  renamed Comodoro Riavdavia in 1937 and Madryn in 1942. She was sold in 1967.
 , a survey ship commissioned in 1974.

Argentine Navy ship names